Sex and Breakfast is a 2007 independent dark comedy film starring Macaulay Culkin, Eliza Dushku, Alexis Dziena and Kuno Becker. Shooting took place in September 2006. The film opened in Los Angeles November 30, 2007, and was released on DVD on January 22, 2008 by First Look Pictures. The film was directed by first-time director Miles Brandman.

Plot
Young couples experiment  with anonymous group sex as a way to revitalize their troubled relationships. Through the experience they are forced to rethink the rudiments of a successful relationship: sex, love, and communication.

One couple, James and Heather, have lost the spark in their relationship; a cold distance has grown between them and their intimate moments feel forced. Heather is a take-charge problem solver who sometimes gets too carried away for her own good. James, meanwhile, has recently discovered that he is easily manipulated.

Another couple, Ellis and Renee, fear that they are at the beginning of the end of their relationship. Renee is thoughtful and honest, but recently she has found herself feeling slightly isolated and bored with Ellis, who puts on a brash, macho front to disguise his insecurity.

Both couples seek therapy with Dr. Wellbridge, who offers them experimental treatment to rekindle their foundering relationships. On the doctor's orders, the couples embark on a partner swap that leaves some thrilled and others thwarted, but the truth about their relationships is revealed to all four.

Cast
 Macaulay Culkin as James
 Kuno Becker as Ellis
 Eliza Dushku as Renee
 Alexis Dziena as Heather
 Joanna Miles as Dr. Wellbridge
 Eric Lively as Charlie
 Jaime Ray Newman as Betty
 Tracie Thoms as Sarah, Female Tenant
 Anita Gnan as Mickey
 Robert Carradine as Angry Driver
 John Pleshette as Older Man In Elevator
 Maree Cheatham as Older Woman In Elevator
 Vincent Jerosa as Brian
 Margaret Travolta as Gail

External links
 
 
 
 
 

2007 films
American independent films
2007 black comedy films
American black comedy films
2007 directorial debut films
2007 comedy films
2007 independent films
2000s English-language films
2000s American films